Blue Eagle is a fictional character appearing in American comic books published by Marvel Comics. The character is not from the main reality where stories are set in the Marvel Universe, but from an alternate universe.(See Sidebar)

Publication history

The character was created by Roy Thomas and John Buscema, and debuted as a member of the team of superheroes called the Squadron Supreme in The Avengers #85 (Feb. 1971) as American Eagle, then as Cap'n Hawk in The Avengers #148 (June 1976), and finally as Blue Eagle in Squadron Supreme #1 (Sept. 1985).

Fictional character biography
James Dore Sr. operated during World War II under the persona of American Eagle, outfitted with a pair of wings which he obtained through unknown means. During this period, he was allied with other heroes such as Power Princess and Professor Imam as members of the Golden Agency. At an unspecified time after the war, he had retired, was married and sired a son years later.

James Dore Jr., who was born in Mayflower, Freedonia on his Earth, was an airplane mechanic. He began his career as a superhero when he inherited the mantle of the American Eagle from his father and joined the Squadron Supreme. With the Squadron Supreme, he encountered the Avengers Goliath II, Quicksilver, Scarlet Witch, and the Vision. Eventually Dore abandoned the American Eagle identity after a falling out with his father over political differences, and adopted the identity of Cap'n Hawk. Alongside the Squadron Supreme, he battled the Avengers on behalf of the Serpent Cartel, and then turned against the Cartel when their hold on him was broken. Alongside the Squadron and Thor, he battled Emil Burbank and the evil Hyperion. Alongside the Squadron, he was mind-controlled by the Overmind. Cap'n Hawk and the Squadron were used as pawns in the Overmind's conquest of Earth-712. The Squadron members were freed by the Defenders, and the two teams battled and defeated the Overmind and his ally Null, the Living Darkness.

The Squadron Supreme, as a result of their conflict with the Overmind, instituted the "Utopia Program". They assumed control of Earth-712's United States, and publicly revealed their true identities. James again adopted another identity after his father died from a heart attack. Using a costume made by his dead father, he took the name Blue Eagle. With the Squadron, he battled a group of rebel soldiers at Fort Largo. The Squadron then battled the Institute of Evil. Dore then discovered that the Golden Archer had used the Behavior Modification Device on Lady Lark, and called for the Archer's dismissal from the team. Blue Eagle was captured by Nighthawk's Redeemers and placed under Master Menace's Behavior Modification machine.

Blue Eagle recovered and returned to the Squadron, just in time for the Redeemers' attack on Squadron City. During the battle, Blue Eagle killed the Black Archer with his mace, but lost the use of his wings after Lamprey drained the artificial gravity effect from them. Blue Eagle fell and crashed into Pinball, breaking his neck and the back of Pinball. Both Blue Eagle and Pinball died immediately and were placed in cryostasis until they could be revived and their injuries repaired.

Blue Eagle's wings were later adopted by fellow Squadron member Lady Lark, as she had grown to love Dore shortly before his death. Lady Lark later changed her codename to Skylark.

After a period of time when the surviving members of the Squadron Supreme had returned to Earth-712 from their forced exile, they found the government of Earth combined to create an armed force of Blue Eagles to patrol and keep the populace docile. These troops would be opposed by the Squadron along with the Eagle's opposite number, the Nighthawks.

Powers and abilities
Blue Eagle wears a specially designed flying suit of synthetic stretch fabric equipped with artificial wings on his back enabling natural winged flight, that was designed by his father James Dore Sr. (the original American Eagle) and his mother Adrian Dore. These wings had a "anti-gravity effect" that allowed Dore to fly.

Equipment
The Blue Eagle costume could be enhanced with a shield, light armor, and a protective helmet.

Other versions

Supreme Power version
A version of Blue Eagle appears in Supreme Power, a modern revamp of the Squadron Supreme, in the possible future timeline of the Supreme Power: Hyperion mini-series.

Dore was highly skilled in hand-to-hand combat, specializing in aerial combat. He demonstrated a wide range of skill with ancient melee weapons.

Heroes Reborn (2021)
In the 2021 "Heroes Reborn" reality, Blue Eagle is a member of the Secret Squadron. During the fight with Siege Society, Blue Eagle was subdued by Sabretooth and Silver Witch. Black Widow and Hawkeye later killed him and stole the wings off his suit so that they and Fire Ant can get away. Following the fight with the Siege Society, Tom Thumb, Nighthawk, and Blur mourn the deaths of their fallen comrades Amphibian, Arcanna Jones, Blue Eagle, and Golden Archer.

References

Characters created by John Buscema
Characters created by Roy Thomas
Comics characters introduced in 1971
Fictional mechanics
Fictional shield fighters
Marvel Comics male superheroes
Marvel Comics superheroes
United States-themed superheroes
Squadron Supreme